Aegialites californicus is a species of narrow-waisted bark beetle in the family Salpingidae. It is found in North America.

References

Further reading

 
 
 
 

Salpingidae
Beetles described in 1845